Charles Allen (31 May 1878 – 22 May 1958) was an English first-class cricketer who played for Gloucestershire County Cricket Club in two matches in 1909. He was born and died in Cirencester.

References

External links
 Cricket Archive Profile

1878 births
1958 deaths
English cricketers
Gloucestershire cricketers
People from Cirencester
Cricketers from Gloucestershire